El Ksar is a town and commune in the Gafsa Governorate, Tunisia. As of 2004 it had a population of 29,617.

See also
List of cities in Tunisia

References

Communes of Tunisia
Populated places in Gafsa Governorate
Tunisia geography articles needing translation from French Wikipedia